Malaysia–Myanmar relations are foreign relations between Malaysia and Myanmar. Both are the members of ASEAN and enjoy good relations. Although the relations become strained in late 2016 due to the Rohingya people issues, the relations remained stable after the meeting between both countries' armed forces chiefs to play down the issues. Myanmar currently has an embassy in Kuala Lumpur, and Malaysia has an embassy in Yangon.

History 

The relations between the two countries were established on 1 March 1957 and the first Burma mission at the legation level was set up in Kuala Lumpur in June 1959 and later raised to the embassy level.

Economic relations 
From 2011–2012, the total of Myanmar exports to Malaysia worth over US$152.038 million while the imports from Malaysia during the same year worth over US$303.410 million and the total trade reached US$455.448 million. Myanmar’s ten main exports items to Malaysia were rubber, fish, prawns, sesame, clothes, timber, tamarind, green gram, pigeon peas, and corn while its ten main imports items from Malaysia such as oil, raw plastics ware, petroleum and chemical products, metal construction appliances, wires, medical products, electrical and electronic machineries, mechanical appliances and crops oil. Beside that, Myanmar is currently need more investment from others country such as Malaysia to develop the country economy. In 2017, a memorandum of understanding (MoU) in healthcare deal was signed by Malaysia Healthcare Travel Council (MHTC) to  promoting healthcare services to Myanmar citizens in Malaysia which will also encourage knowledge and skill transfer between doctors of the two countries.

Rohingya refugee issues 
Following the Rakhine State riots since 2012, thousands of Rohingya people have been exodus from Myanmar and this sparked the Rohingya refugee crisis in 2015 to Myanmar neighbouring countries.

Malaysia protest to Myanmar 
Due to the unstoppable human exodus from Myanmar until 2016 which also have since affecting Malaysia, Prime Minister Najib Razak decide to join a rally to Myanmar embassy with the protestors gathered in Titiwangsa Stadium of Kuala Lumpur. The event was organised by Malay Muslim groups, political parties as well non-governmental organisations (NGOs) in 4 December to urge Myanmar to stop of what been labelled by Malaysia as a “genocide to Muslim as well to its minority people” and calling the international community to put a pressure into Myanmar. During the rally, the Prime Minister said:

The Malaysian Prime Minister mocked the Myanmar Nobel laureates winner Aung San Suu Kyi for her inaction over the issues, as well issuing a response via Twitter in which he stated that “it was not my intention to interfere in Myanmar’s internal affairs but that the cruelty against Rohingya had gone too far”.

The Malaysian side also cancelling two football friendly matches of their U-22 team with Myanmar U-23 as well previously threatening to pull out their team from the 2016 AFF Championship to protest Myanmar as a Group B host where Malaysia were placed in the same group after persistent calls from the country Muslim individuals, groups and political parties to boycott Myanmar for their alleged persecution to the Rohingya people.

Despite various questions and conspiracy arise from the Malaysian public, the Malaysian Foreign Affairs Ministry view the recent rally joined by the Malaysian Prime Minister as legal due to the spillover effects which became a security concern for Malaysia with the continuous arrival of Rohingya refugees from Myanmar and explained that the matter is “not just about religious issues but humanitarian concerns”.

The Federation of Malaysian Manufacturers (FMM) said earlier following the decision of Myanmar government to halt its workers prior to the ongoing issues, the move will affect Malaysia industry. However, this was denied by Malaysian Deputy Human Resources Minister as they can look up on other source of labours from other countries.

Myanmar reactions to the protest 
As a reaction, Myanmar nationalists, led by activist and monk Sayadaw Pamaukkha, began to protest against the Malaysian Prime Minister's decision to join the rally. They suggested that Malaysia should “take all Rohingya people in their country and integrate into the Malaysian society if they (the Malaysians) love the Rohingya so much as we the Myanmar people don't want our race, religion and nation from disappearing due to the fast growth of Rohingya population” (with Myanmar previous junta administration labelling the Rohingya as immigrants from Bangladesh especially during the Operation King Dragon with many are claimed to be insurgents and illegal immigrants who fled from the Bangladesh Liberation War). The group also remind Myanmar citizen in Malaysia to be careful as some extreme group and NGOs in the country have inciting hatred to Malaysians to hate Myanmar people, adding that “they would organise a similar protest in their country to condemn the Malaysian action but not burning the Malaysian flag as had been done by some of the Malaysian protesters to Myanmar flag in recent rally”. Earlier before Malaysian Prime Minister join the rally, Myanmar President's Office Deputy-Director and Spokesman for Myanmar President Htin Kyaw, Zaw Htay urge Malaysia to “respecting their sovereign affairs and to stop interfering in their country affairs”.

Zaw Htay has announced that the Government of Myanmar would issue an official response objecting to Malaysian Prime Minister participation in the rally and said “Our new government is working on a solution to the Rohingya issues and I want to say again that the Malaysian government should respect the ASEAN charter”. Adding that the rally that was supported by Malaysian leader “could stoke religious extremism and amounted to vote-seeking ahead of a Malaysian election expected soon” as well criticising Malaysian media for giving a bias report and playing up the Rohingya issues. Malaysian ambassador to Myanmar were summoned previously since the Malaysian government raise their concern on the issues although Myanmar did not yet issued any instructions on a change to diplomatic posture with Malaysia. As a condemnation to the Malaysian Prime Minister action, Myanmar protesters gather in Mahabandoola Park of Yangon on 5 December. The Myanmar National Monk Union also release a statement that:

With other monk members issuing a letter:

And another Myanmar protest leader rejecting international pressure on Myanmar as suggested by the Malaysian Prime Minister. On a statement, he said:

Advisor to former President Thein Sein, Ko Ko Hlaing accused Malaysian Prime Minister of exploiting the issue to divert public attention away from corruption allegations levelled against him.

While the Myanmar Committee for the Protection of Race and Religion of Ma Ba Tha slammed Malaysian Prime Minister action for meddling and “insulting Myanmar and Aung San Suu Kyi’s handling of the affairs” with the group leaders said a letter will be translated and delivered to the Malaysian embassy in Yangon. Myanmar journalist also explained that Suu Kyi are not ignoring the Rohingya plight as has been accused by Najib, but the new administration especially with her limited powers as well with many other Myanmar internal issues hardened the process much over when Rakhine State politicians continue to disapprove the attempts of State Counsellor's (headed by Suu Kyi) handling of the situation.

Prior to the ongoing issues with Malaysia especially due to the demonstrations against Myanmar, the Myanmar Labour Department indefinitely suspended sending of migrant workers to the country beginning from 7 December. Until 5 May 2017, there were still no green light from the Myanmar side to allow their workers to go to Malaysia as there are many reported cases where Myanmar workers have been killed in Malaysia; although traffickers continue to smuggle Myanmar workers to the country.

Views from other Malaysian public, experts and United Nations rapporteur on the issues 

Earlier in October 2016, a Malaysian Malay newspaper of Harian Metro reported on the behaviour of Rohingya in Malaysia who had been using government land without permission, operating business without licence and using public parking spaces like their own land for their business storage with the activities have been ongoing for more than 10 years ago without any action from the Malaysian local administration government. The behaviour of Rohingya immigrants and asylum seekers was heavily criticised by many of the Malaysians public especially from the majority Malays with some commenting the news release in Facebook as “no wonder they been discriminated in Myanmar with this kind of behaviour”, with other chided the situation as “a result from religious organisations inside the country who like to urged the government to take every Muslim refugees from war-torn countries just because of the same religion and under the excuse of humanity without checking the background of those refugees first” as well some said that “this country will soon be overtaken by these refugees and we will become a minority in our own land although they have the same religion with us”. Thailand-based expert on ASEAN affairs, Kavi Chongkittavorn describe Malaysian Prime Minister actions “as an attempt to gain support from his country’s Muslim community and that his concern could be more effectively registered through discreet diplomacy than openly be made as the Myanmar government who will be held to consequences for what is happening after the accusations by the Malaysian leader as the issues is an internal problem that has regional implications”. United Nations Special Rapporteur on the rights to freedom of peaceful assembly and of association from Kenya, Maina Kiai lauded the Malaysian government efforts to fight for the marginalised Rohingya community but remind the government to look to their own minority groups first who been discriminated in the country before trying to look up on other countries issues.

The Malaysian government humanity sincerity are also been questioned by reporters in their own country for their sudden help as previously Malaysian authorities is seen rejecting the Rohingya to set foot on Malaysian soils while their boat is drifting in the sea after escaping from Myanmar. In addition, the poor condition of the already available Rohingya in Malaysia with most of them are unable to study or send their children to school, no access to healthcare, and their new children who born in the country are unregistered, unable to work legally and vulnerable to exploitation by unscrupulous employers as Malaysia is not a signatory to the 1951 Refugee Convention have mostly been criticised by journalists and non-governmental organisations in the country. The government also been alleged as bias as they “only selecting discriminated people who are Muslims”, as if they are not Muslims the government will not care them at all has been exampled from the Vietnamese boat people incident where they only been put in Bidong Island and shooed away as the Vietnamese are looked more like a Chinese and not Muslim with the Malaysian Deputy Prime Minister at the time Mahathir Mohamad threatened to use force to shoot them if they continuously reaching Malaysian shore as Mahathir worried the increase of non-Muslims population in Malaysia will threatened the majority Malay and Muslim population”. The Malaysian government also been alleged as trying to make the Rohingya as part of Malaysian citizens to use them to vote the ruling party for the next Malaysian general election has been exampled from the Moro Muslim refugees in the state of Sabah who fleeing the political uncertainty in the Philippines in the 1970s when they been registered as a citizen and used as a voter to topple the state government who are Christian at the time and to maintain the ruling Muslim party to administer the state.

The issues of Rohingya refugees test Malaysia's chairmanship on ASEAN as previously Malaysia together with Indonesia and Thailand rejecting boats carrying Rohingya asylum seekers from reaching their shores mainly due to domestic concerns on illegal immigrants. But with the criticism from United Nations human rights chief Zeid Ra’ad al-Hussein to the three countries for turning away the asylum seekers, the Malaysian and Indonesian leaders decide to hold a meeting where the two finally agreed to provide temporary shelter for the Rohingya under "humanitarian concerns" under a term that the international community should assist to repatriate and resettle these refugees to other third world countries soon as Malaysia is not a signatory to the 1951 Refugee Convention with the United Nations been told not to use Malaysia's compassion to allowing more refugees to seek shelter in the country as it is also against the long-term solution for Malaysia to repatriate illegal immigrants in the country. Furthermore, the ethnic conflicts and violence between Myanmar ethnic groups brought by the asylum seekers has threatened the safety of Malaysian citizens in their own homeland. The continuous acceptance of Muslim refugees from unstable countries under the excuse of “humanitarian concerns and religious sympathy” especially during Mahathir administration of strong Islamic foreign policy that was continued until this day by Najib received backlash from the Malaysian general public as this has been perceive that the government are putting more priority to foreigners than its own citizens suffering especially with the rampant crimes and social problems committed by the asylum seekers in Malaysia.

Attempts to play down the issues 
The Malaysian government then sent the Malaysian Armed Forces chief to meet the Myanmar Tatmadaw chief and Myanmar President to repair the already “fraught relations between the two countries as a result from the Rohingya issues” with the Myanmar President Office describe the strained relations as a result of “false news”. In response to the ongoing disagreement between both countries, a group of Muslim organisation in Myanmar sent an open letter to the Malaysian government expressing their disapproval of the country's response, stating “that is doing more harm than good for Muslim people in Myanmar”. The letter reads:

Malaysia Foreign Minister Anifah Aman has prepared to meet Myanmar's State Counselor Aung San Suu Kyi to determine how it can assist to help Myanmar to stop the continuous violence as Myanmar previously has called on other ASEAN countries to participate in the recent developments in their country including Rakhine State where the Rohingya are located following Myanmar participation in the ASEAN foreign ministers meeting led by Malaysia. Earlier, Malaysia's Foreign Ministry propose to hold an emergency meeting relating about the Rohingya in Laos but were rejected by the country. The Malaysian Foreign Deputy Minister also clarified that despite the issues, the relations between the two countries are still normal.

See also 
 Burmese in Malaysia
 Burmese Malays

Further reading 
 Malaysia-Myanmar relations since 1958 at the Journal of International Studies (Volume 4, 2008, Pages 75 to 90)

References

External links 
 Embassy of Malaysia in Myanmar
 Embassy of Myanmar in Malaysia

 
Bilateral relations of Myanmar
Myanmar